The following is a list of Japan women's national rugby union team international matches.

Overall 
Japan's overall international match record against all nations, updated to 22 February 2023, is as follows:

Full internationals

Legend

1990s

2000s

2010s

2020s

Other matches

References

External links 

 Official Japan Schedules
 Official Japan Results

Japan women's national rugby union team